Sten Michael Grytebust (born 25 October 1989) is a Norwegian professional footballer who plays as a goalkeeper for Aalesund. 

He previously played for Aalesunds FK in the Norwegian Tippeligaen and, until the end of the 2018–19 season, for Odense Boldklub in Denmark. He made his debut for the Norway national team in 2013.

Early life
Born in Ålesund in western Norway, Grytebust was raised on the adjacent island of Ellingsøy. His father is a native of Ellingsøy and his mother is Liberian and Grytebust has described former Liberian international George Weah as his idol growing up.

Grytebust did not originally play as a goalkeeper, but as a teenager deputised in goal when his team's goalkeeper was injured. A good performance led to him becoming the first-choice goalkeeper for the side. In 2004, aged 15 he was approached by Aalesunds FK, but chose to play for Ellingsøy IL's first-team in the Norwegian fourth tier before joining Aalesund's youth team one year later. After two season in the youth setup, Grytebust joined Aalesund's first team ahead of the 2008 season.

Club career
After joining Aalesund's first-team squad, the young Grytebust was the third-choice goalkeeper behind Adin Brown, Andreas Lie and later Anders Lindegaard who joined the side on loan. In August 2009, after Lindegaard's loan-spell ended the team's coaching staff decided to give Grytebust his first team debut in place of Lie. He made his debut against local rivals Molde FK on 22 August 2009, and delivered a good performance despite conceding three goals. After his debut, Aalesund signed Lindegaard permanently and Lie left the team, leaving Grytebust as the second-choice goalkeeper for the following season. He played in the two first rounds of the 2010 Norwegian Football Cup.

Grytebust was told by the club during autumn 2009 that he would be the next first-choice goalkeeper at the club. After the 2010 season, Lindegaard was bought by Manchester United and Grytebust was confirmed as the team's goalkeeper. Lindegaard stated that he believed Grytebust was ready for the task, and was certain that he would play for the Norwegian national side one day.

The 2011 season started poorly with Aalesund losing against Fredrikstad partly due to a bad goal kick by Grytebust, but after his match-winning saves against Viking and Stabæk, the team's head coach Kjetil Rekdal also predicted Grytebust would be the next national team goalkeeper. He delivered a stable performance throughout the season and was rewarded by being selected to the Under-23 national team together with his teammate Peter Orry Larsen, despite neither of them knowing that such a team existed. His performance also received praise from national team goalkeeping coach Frode Grodås who stated that Grytebust was "without weaknesses". After ending the season with a victory in the 2011 Norwegian Football Cup Final, Grytebust was named "Aalesund player of the year" by the local paper, Sunnmørsposten alongside Daniel Arnefjord.

The 2012 season continued with Grytebust unchallenged as first-choice goalkeeper for Aalesund. Results varied and he received criticism when Aalesund were eliminated from the domestic cup in the fourth round against Sandefjord, with Grytebust being sloppy with a pass and conceding a goal. Later, during a match against SK Brann, he was again careless with a goal-kick, which ended with another goal conceded. In August the club reported that it had re-signed Andreas Lie as a back-up keeper, with Lie stating that he was keen to "play for a permanent spot".

Grytebust left Aalesund in February 2016, joining Danish Superliga club Odense BK on a free transfer. He was voted Danish goalkeeper of the year in both 2017 and 2018 before joining FC København, again on a free transfer in May 2019, having opted not to sign a new contract at Odense. On 31 August 2021, Grytebust was loaned out to Vejle Boldklub for the 2021–22 season.

On 15 February 2022, Grytebust returned to Aalesund on a two-year contract.

International career
Grytebust was first called up for the Norway national team in June 2013, and made his debut a friendly match against Macedonia on 11 June 2013 when he replaced André Hansen a couple of minutes before full-time. He became the 150th player Egil "Drillo" Olsen used during his two spells as national team coach.

Career statistics

Club

International

Honours
Aalesund
Norwegian Football Cup: 2009, 2011

References

External links

1989 births
Living people
Sportspeople from Møre og Romsdal
Sportspeople from Ålesund
Norwegian footballers
Association football goalkeepers
Aalesunds FK players
Odense Boldklub players
F.C. Copenhagen players
Vejle Boldklub players
Eliteserien players
Danish Superliga players
Norway youth international footballers
Norway under-21 international footballers
Norway international footballers
Norwegian expatriate footballers
Expatriate men's footballers in Denmark
Norwegian expatriate sportspeople in Denmark
Norwegian people of Liberian descent
Sportspeople of Liberian descent